The Yamabuggy is a side-by-side dune buggy. It made its international debut in Las Vegas, Nevada, at the SEMA Convention. It is designed to be a quick and agile competitor to vehicles such as the Yamaha Rhino. 

The buggy has been featured in magazines such as "Dirt Wheels", "ATV Sport", and "Sand Sport". 

Although the vehicle can be classified as a small dune buggy, it has also been known to traverse other terrains, such as dirt/desert trails, forest areas, mud, and snow.
Kyle Purdue is the principal of Yama Buggy Sales & Distribution.

References

External links

Off-road vehicles